Belad Motaleb-e Olya (also Romanized as Belād Moţaleb-e ‘Olyā; also known as Belād Moţlab-e Bālā and Belād Moţlab-e Seyyed Fākher) is a village in Abdoliyeh-ye Sharqi Rural District, in the Central District of Ramshir County, Khuzestan Province, Iran. At the 2006 census, its population was 84, in 13 families.

References 

Populated places in Ramshir County